Newton, Massachusetts, USA-based Barrett Technology was incorporated by William T. Townsend in 1990.  Barrett manufactures robotic arms and hands installed in 20 countries on 6 continents.  Barrett is credited in The Guinness Book of World Records, Millennium Edition, as maker of the world’s “most advanced robotic arm.”  Its 7-axis robotic arm, named the WAM arm for Whole Arm Manipulation is based on Puck electronics and mechanical drive technologies and designed to interact directly with people.  One application of an early version of the technology has been the arm manufactured and sold by MAKO Surgical Corp. which enables haptically-guided minimally-invasive knee surgery.

The Puck powered BarrettHand BH8-series product is based on technology licensed from the University of Pennsylvania and developed by Gill Pratt, Yoky Matsuoka, and William Townsend into its present form.

Company history

Sources

References

Manufacturing companies based in Massachusetts
Robotics companies of the United States